Krombia zarcinella is a moth in the family Crambidae. It is found in Tunisia.

References

Cybalomiinae
Moths described in 1909